The Sumatran elephant (Elephas maximus sumatranus) is one of four recognized subspecies of the Asian elephant, and native to the Indonesian island of Sumatra. In 2011, IUCN upgraded the conservation status of the Sumatran elephant from endangered to critically endangered in its Red List as the population had declined by at least 80% during the past three generations, estimated to be about 75 years. The subspecies is preeminently threatened by habitat loss, degradation and fragmentation, and poaching; over 69% of potential elephant habitat has been lost within the last 25 years.

Characteristics 
In general, Asian elephants are smaller than African elephants and have the highest body point on the head. The tip of their trunk has one finger-like process. Their back is convex or level. Females are usually smaller than males, and have short or no tusks.

Their skin colour is lighter than of maximus and indicus with the least depigmentation.

Distribution and habitat
The Sumatran elephant was once widespread on the island, and Riau Province was believed to have the largest elephant population in Sumatra with over 1,600 individuals in the 1980s. In 1985, an island-wide rapid survey suggested that between 2,800 and 4,800 elephants lived in all eight mainland provinces of Sumatra in 44 populations. Twelve of these populations occurred in Lampung Province, where only three populations were extant in 2002 according to surveys carried out between September 2000 and March 2002. The population in Bukit Barisan Selatan National Park was estimated at 498 individuals, while the population in Way Kambas National Park was estimated at 180 individuals. The third population in Gunung Rindingan–Way Waya complex was considered to be too small to be viable over the long-term.

By 2008, elephants had become locally extinct in 23 of the 43 ranges identified in Sumatra in 1985, indicating a very significant decline of the Sumatran elephant population up to that time. By 2008, the elephant was locally extinct in West Sumatra Province and at risk of being lost from North Sumatra Province too. In Riau Province only about 350 elephants survived across nine separate ranges.

, the population of Sumatran elephants is estimated to be 2,400–2,800 wild individuals, excluding elephants in camps, in 25 fragmented populations across the island. More than 85% of their habitat is outside of protected areas.

In Aceh, radio-collared Sumatran elephant clans preferred areas in dense natural forests in river and mountain valleys at elevation below ; from there, they moved into heterogenous forests and foraged near human settlements mainly by night.

Ecology and behaviour 
Female elephants stop reproducing after 60 years of age. The maximum longevity in the wild is around 60 years. Female captive elephants have survived until 75 years while males have survived 60 years.
They give birth mostly at night, which lasts about 10 seconds. The calf is able to stand up on its own after 10 to 30 minutes. 

Female elephants hit their growth plateau at a younger age and develop faster than male elephants, while male elephants grow to larger size and continue to grow as they age.

Threats
Due to conversion of forests into human settlements, agricultural areas and plantations, many of the Sumatran elephant populations have lost their habitat to humans. As a result, many elephants have been removed from the wild or directly killed. In addition to conflict related death, elephants are also targets of poaching for their ivory. Between 1985 and 2007, 50% of Sumatran elephants died. Between 1980 and 2005, 69% of potential Sumatran elephant habitat was lost within just one elephant generation, and the driving forces that caused this habitat loss still remain essentially unchecked. There is clear, direct evidence from two provinces, Riau and Lampung, which shows entire elephant populations have disappeared as a result of habitat loss.
Most of the elephants found in Sumatran camps were captured after crop-raiding in protected areas. The reduction of the elephants' habitat for illegal conversion of agriculture still continues.

Between 2012 and 2015, 36 elephants were found dead in Aceh Province due to poisoning, electrocution and traps. Most dead elephants were found near palm oil plantations. Conservationists think that Sumatran elephants may become extinct in less than ten years if poaching is not stopped.

Sumatran elephants prefer areas of low elevation and gentler slopes, including those along the river and mountain valleys; humans also prefer these same features, which results in competition between elephants and humans for the same space, and at all times leads to a loss of preferred elephant habitat. Also, crop protection efforts, which mainly consist of chasing elephants out of crop fields or moving them deeper into the forest away from the crops, has restricted access for elephants to these areas.

Conservation 

Elephas maximus is listed on CITES Appendix I. Sumatran elephants are protected under Indonesian law.

In 2004, the Tesso Nilo National Park has been established in Riau Province to protect the Sumatran elephant's habitat. This forest is one of the last areas large enough to support a viable population of elephants.

Between 1986 and 1995, 520 wild elephants were captured and kept in six Elephant Training Centres, which have been established since 1986 in the provinces of Lampung, Aceh, Bengkulu, North and South Sumatra, and Riau. Capturing wild elephants was stopped in 1999, since the maintenance of captive elephants was too expensive, their management had not become self-financing and because some of the centres were overcrowded. By the end of 2000, 391 elephants were kept in the centres, and a few more in zoos, safari parks and tourist areas.

See also
 Borneo elephant

References

External links

 WWF: Sumatran elephant

Elephants
Endemic fauna of Indonesia
Fauna of Sumatra
Mammals of Indonesia
Critically endangered fauna of Asia
Taxa named by Coenraad Jacob Temminck